Gallium chloride may refer to:

 Gallium trichloride (gallium(III) chloride/digallium hexachloride), GaCl3
  (gallium(I,III) chloride/digallium tetrachloride), GaCl2 (GaGaCl4)
 Gallium monochloride (gallium(I) chloride), GaCl